Burnt Hill is a mountain located in the Catskill Mountains of New York north of New Kingston. Round Top is located north of Burnt Hill and Mill Mountain is located west.

References

Mountains of Delaware County, New York
Mountains of New York (state)